Gary Fasching is an American football coach.  He is the head football coach at Saint John's University in Collegeville, Minnesota, a position he has held since the 2013. He succeeded John Gagliardi as head coach after working as an assistant under him for 17 seasons.  Fasching was the head football coach at Cathedral High School in St. Cloud, Minnesota from 1986 to 1995, winning two state championships.

Head coaching record

College

|-
| 2020
| Saint John's
|colspan=5| Season cancelled due to the COVID–19 pandemic
|-

References

External links
 Saint John's profile

Year of birth missing (living people)
Living people
American football linebackers
Saint John's Johnnies football coaches
Saint John's Johnnies football players
High school football coaches in Minnesota